Sierakowo may refer to:

Sierakowo, Golub-Dobrzyń County in Kuyavian-Pomeranian Voivodeship (north-central Poland)
Sierakowo, Mogilno County in Kuyavian-Pomeranian Voivodeship (north-central Poland)
Sierakowo, Płońsk County in Masovian Voivodeship (east-central Poland)
Sierakowo, Przasnysz County in Masovian Voivodeship (east-central Poland)
Sierakowo, Kościan County in Greater Poland Voivodeship (west-central Poland)
Sierakowo, Rawicz County in Greater Poland Voivodeship (west-central Poland)
Sierakowo, Słupca County in Greater Poland Voivodeship (west-central Poland)
Sierakowo, Police County in West Pomeranian Voivodeship (north-west Poland)
Sierakowo, Stargard County in West Pomeranian Voivodeship (north-west Poland)